The 2014 Austin Aces season was the 12th season of the franchise in World TeamTennis (WTT) and its first in Greater Austin, Texas after relocating from Orange County, California.

The Aces had 6 wins and 8 losses and finished third in the Western Conference. They failed to qualify for the playoffs.

Season recap

Relocation to Austin and trade for Roddick
On November 21, 2013, WTT announced that entrepreneur Lorne Abony had purchased the Orange County Breakers and relocated them to Austin, Texas renaming the team the Austin Aces. Concurrent with the announcement of the move of the franchise, the Aces announced that they had acquired Andy Roddick in a trade with the Springfield Lasers in exchange for financial consideration. Roddick, a resident of Austin, said, "The fans and team in Springfield were great to me, and I really appreciate their support. Austin, however, is my home, and I am excited to be able to play here in front of my friends and family. I have played Mylan World TeamTennis since I was a teenager, and I believe in the way this league connects with community and provides kids access to professional tennis." Although the WTT press release mentioned that the Aces and Lasers would also swap positions in the Marquee Player Draft (improving the Lasers' draft position), this was not reflected when the league later reported the results of that draft.

Lloyd hired as coach
On December 30, 2013, the Aces announced they had hired John Lloyd as the team's head coach.

Cedar Park Center becomes new home venue
On January 8, 2014, the Aces announced that they would play their home matches at the Cedar Park Center in Cedar Park, Texas. The Aces mentioned in the press release that the team considered playing home matches in a climate-controlled, indoor facility as a key factor to its success on the court as well as for the enjoyment of the fans, since Austin often experiences very hot weather during the summer.

Drafts
With the Breakers having the best record among non-playoff teams at 7 wins and 7 losses in 2013, the Aces had the fourth selection in each round of the Marquee Player Draft. In the first round, the Aces protected Andy Roddick. In the second round, they selected Marion Bartoli. With WTT contracting the Las Vegas Neon, the Aces moved up one spot and had the third selection in each round of the Roster Player Draft. The Aces selected Vera Zvonareva and Eva Hrdinová in the first two rounds and protected Treat Huey in the third round. They passed on making a fourth round selection.

Leach replaces Lloyd
On July 5, 2014, the Aces announced that John Lloyd would be unable to serve as the team's coach due to a knee injury. Rick Leach was signed to replace Lloyd.

Free agent player signings
On July 5, 2014, the Aces announced that they had signed 2012 WTT Male Rookie of the Year John-Patrick Smith as a substitute player.

On July 20, 2014, the Aces signed Jesse Witten as a substitute player.

On July 21, 2014, the Aces signed Varvara Lepchenko as a substitute player.

On July 23, 2014, the Aces signed Jason Jung as a substitute player.

First match as the Aces
On July 7, 2014, the Aces played their first match representing Greater Austin on the road against the San Diego Aviators in what was the first match for that franchise since moving from New York City. Andy Roddick was the first player to take the court representing the Aces but lost the opening set of men's singles. Vera Zvonareva took the second set of women's singles for the Aces. But the Aviators dominated the rest of the match, winning the final three sets on their way to a 23–11 victory.

Home opener
The Aces played their first home match at Cedar Park Center on July 8, 2014, against the Springfield Lasers. Andy Roddick took the opening set of men's singles. The match was tied at 14 heading to the final set of women's singles which Vera Zvonareva won, 5–3, to give the Aces a 19–17 victory.

Losing streak
After winning their first two home matches to improve their record to 2 wins and 1 loss, the Aces lost 1o straight sets in their fourth and fifth matches, both at home, in losing to the Washington Kastles, 25–10, and the Philadelphia Freedoms, 25–11. Although the Aces won the opening set of their next match against the Springfield Lasers on the road, they fell to their third consecutive defeat, 21–13, dropping their record to 2 wins and 4 losses.

Loss to the Lobsters
After defeating the Boston Lobsters at home in the opening match of a home and home series, the Aces lost to them on the road giving Boston its only win all season. Following falling behind 10–0 after the first two sets, the Aces staged a frantic comeback taking the next three sets to cut the Lobsters' lead to 19–15, and send the match to overtime. Eva Hrdinová and Treat Huey won the first three games of overtime in mixed doubles to cut the lead to 19–18, before Megan Moulton-Levy and Rik de Voest broke through for the Lobsters to avoid a super tiebreaker.

Playoff push
After 11 matches, the Aces found themselves with 4 wins and 7 losses, having lost two straight and six of their previous eight matches. Nevertheless, with three matches remaining, all on the road, they still had an opportunity to reach the playoffs. The Aces got started with a 22–16 victory over their in-state rivals, the Texas Wild. The Aces took four of the five sets in the match. Eva Hrdinová paired with Treat Huey in mixed doubles and with Vera Zvonareva in women's doubles for a couple of set wins. Zvonareva won the women's singles set. Huey teamed with Jesse Witten, who was making his Aces debut, to close out the match with a set win in men's doubles. The win gave the Aces a sweep of their two road matches against the Wild. They lost their only home match against Texas.

The following night, the Aces avenged their home loss against the Philadelphia Freedoms by earning a 21–18 road victory over a team that had dominated them earlier in the season. Varvara Lepchenko won the women's singles set in her Aces debut. Huey teamed with Hrdinová in mixed doubles and Andy Roddick in men's doubles for two set wins. The victory improved the Aces' record to 6 wins and 7 losses and kept them in the playoff race.

On the final day of the regular season, the Aces needed the Boston Lobsters to take a win on the road against the Springfield Lasers to remain in the playoff hunt. The Lasers took care of business, 25–7, to eliminate the Aces. Later that evening, the Aces lost their final match of the season to the San Diego Aviators, 22–12, to finish with 6 wins and 8 losses.

Event chronology
 November 21, 2013: WTT announced that Lorne Abony had purchased the Orange County Breakers and relocated them to Austin, Texas renaming the team the Austin Aces.
 November 21, 2013: The Aces acquired Andy Roddick in a trade with the Springfield Lasers in exchange for financial consideration.
 December 30, 2013: The Aces announced they had hired John Lloyd as the team's head coach.
 January 8, 2014: The Aces announced that they would play their home matches at the Cedar Park Center in Cedar Park, Texas.
 February 11, 2014: The Aces protected Andy Roddick and selected Marion Bartoli in the WTT Marquee Player Draft.
 March 11, 2014: The Aces protected Treat Huey and selected Vera Zvonareva and Eva Hrdinová in the WTT Roster Player Draft.
 July 5, 2014: The Aces announced that John Lloyd would be unable to serve as the team's coach due to a knee injury. Rick Leach was signed to replace Lloyd.
 July 5, 2014: The Aces signed John-Patrick Smith as substitute player.
 July 7, 2014: The franchise lost its first match as the Austin Aces on the road against the San Diego Aviators, 23–11.
 July 8, 2014: The Aces won their first home match at Cedar Park Center against the Springfield Lasers, 19–17.
 July 20, 2014: The Aces signed Jesse Witten as a substitute player.
 July 21, 2014: The Aces signed Varvara Lepchenko as a substitute player.
 July 23, 2014: The Aces signed Jason Jung as a substitute player.
 July 23, 2014: With a record of 6 wins and 7 losses, the Aces were eliminated from playoff contention when the Springfield Lasers defeated the Boston Lobsters, 25–7.

Draft picks
Since the Breakers had the best record among non-playoff teams at 7 wins and 7 losses in 2013, the Aces had the fourth selection in each round of the WTT Marquee Player Draft and moved up to third in the Roster Player Draft after the contraction of the Las Vegas Neon.

Marquee player draft
The Aces protected Andy Roddick after acquiring him in a trade with the Springfield Lasers. They also drafted Marion Bartoli. The selections made by the Aces are shown in the table below.

Roster player draft
The Aces protected Treat Huey making him the only holdover player from the 2013 Orange County Breakers. They also drafted Vera Zvonareva and Eva Hrdinová. The selections made by the Aces are shown in the table below.

Match log

{| align="center" border="1" cellpadding="2" cellspacing="1" style="border:1px solid #aaa"
|-
! colspan="2" style="background:red; color:#CCFF00" | Legend
|-
! bgcolor="ccffcc" | Aces Win
! bgcolor="ffbbbb" | Aces Loss
|-
! colspan="2" | Home team in CAPS
|}

Team personnel
Reference:

On-court personnel
  Rick Leach – Player/Head Coach
  Marion Bartoli
  Eva Hrdinová
  Treat Huey
  Jason Jung
  Varvara Lepchenko
  Andy Roddick
  John-Patrick Smith
  Jesse Witten
  Vera Zvonareva

Front office
 Lorne Abony – Owner
 Kerry Schneider – General Manager

Notes:

Statistics
Players are listed in order of their game-winning percentage provided they played in at least 40% of the Aces' games in that event, which is the WTT minimum for qualification for league leaders in individual statistical categories.

Men's singles

Women's singles

Men's doubles

Women's doubles

Mixed doubles

Team totals

Transactions
 November 21, 2013: The Aces acquired Andy Roddick in a trade with the Springfield Lasers in exchange for financial consideration.
 December 30, 2013: The Aces announced they had hired John Lloyd as the team's head coach.
 February 11, 2014: The Aces protected Andy Roddick and selected Marion Bartoli in the WTT Marquee Player Draft.
 March 11, 2014: The Aces protected Treat Huey and selected Vera Zvonareva and Eva Hrdinová in the WTT Roster Player Draft.
 March 11, 2014: The Aces left Coco Vandeweghe, Steve Johnson, Maria Elena Camerin and Līga Dekmeijere unprotected in the WTT Roster Player Draft effectively making them free agents.
 July 5, 2014: The Aces announced that John Lloyd would be unable to serve as the team's coach due to a knee injury. Rick Leach was signed to replace Lloyd.
 July 5, 2014: The Aces signed John-Patrick Smith as substitute player.
 July 20, 2014: The Aces signed Jesse Witten as a substitute player.
 July 21, 2014: The Aces signed Varvara Lepchenko as a substitute player.
 July 23, 2014: The Aces signed Jason Jung as a substitute player.

Individual achievements
Eva Hrdinová was fifth in WTT in game-winning percentage in mixed doubles.

Charitable support
During each night of the 2014 season, the WTT team with the most aces received US$1,000 toward a local charity of the team's choice as part of a program called Mylan Aces. In the case of a tie, the award was split accordingly. The Aces earned $5,500 for the Andy Roddick Foundation through the program.

See also

References

External links
Austin Aces official website
World TeamTennis official website

Austin Aces season
Austin Aces 2014
Austin Aces season